Neil Wilkinson may refer to:

 Neil Wilkinson (ice hockey) (born 1967), Canadian ice hockey player
 Neil Wilkinson (footballer) (1955–2016), English footballer
Hamilton (musician), Neil Hamilton Wilkinson